Thomas Chafin, Chaffin or Chaffyn may refer to:

Thomas Chaffyn I (died 1558), MP for Salisbury 1529
Thomas Chaffyn II (died 1559), MP for Salisbury 1555 and Heytesbury 1554
Thomas Chaffin, High Sheriff of Dorset in 1579
Thomas Chaffin, High Sheriff of Dorset in 1590
Thomas Chafin (1650–1691), MP for Poole 1679–87, Dorchester 1689 and Hindon 1690–1
Thomas Chafin (1675–1711), MP for Shaftesbury 1699–1701 and Dorset 1702–11